Tashkapur (Dargwa: ЦIунрегIе) is a rural locality (a selo) in Khadzhalmakhinsky Selsoviet, Levashinsky District, Republic of Dagestan, Russia. The population was 1,419 as of 2010.

Geography 
Tashkapur is located 16 km west of Levashi (the district's administrative centre) by road. Khadzhalmakhi and Nizhniye Arshi are the nearest rural localities.

Nationalities 
Dargins live there.

References 

Rural localities in Levashinsky District